"So Fine" is a 1982 soul/dance single by Howard Johnson, former lead singer of Niteflyte.  The single made it to number one on the dance charts for one week.  "So Fine" peaked at  number six on the soul singles chart, but failed to make the Hot 100. Fonzi Thornton provided vocals on the single. A music video for the single featured dancers that also appeared on Soul Train and Solid Gold.

In September 1982, the single reached number 45 in the UK Singles Chart. It remained on the chart for 6 weeks.

In 2020, the song appeared in a commercial for Downy, featuring Cam Newton.

Track listing
12" vinyl
 US: A&M / SP-12048

Charts

Weekly charts

Year-end charts

References

1982 singles
1982 songs
Songs written by Kashif (musician)
A&M Records singles
Songs written by Paul Laurence